Scott Act may refer to:

 Scott Act (1863), which guaranteed the right to separate schools in what became Ontario, Canada, named for Richard William Scott
 Scott Act (1878), the Canada Temperance Act in the Dominion of Canada, also named for Richard William Scott
 Scott Act (1888), an American law prohibiting immigration of virtually all Chinese by rescinding certificates of reentry for Chinese who were then abroad